Treasure is an animated television series that ran from 13 September 2000 until 17 December 2001 and aired on BBC Two in the United Kingdom, ABC Kids in Australia, and YTV in Canada. It aired for 1 season of 13 episodes. The series was based on the popular newspaper column of the same name by Michele Hanson which became a book, Treasure: The Trials of a Teenage Terror (Virago Press, 2001), published under the pseudonym Gina Davidson. Treasure chronicles the life of Michele Hanson's daughter, Amy Hanson. 17 years later, Hanson died on 2 March 2018 at the age of 75.

Production
The characters were designed by illustrator Christine Roche.

This show was aimed at an older audience than most other works by CINAR (now known as "WildBrain"), and was consequently able to discuss darker themes and make more use of profanity.

Like Bob & Margaret (another Canadian-made television series), this show was set in England, but added with darker themes.

Major Characters
 Treasure (voiced by Jasmine Fitter) -  The title character, a fourteen-year-old girl who lives with her mother and grandmother. She is in many ways as a typical rowdy dumb blonde, with a love of hanging out with her friends, shopping, fashion, and rebelling against her family. A major focus of the show is how her family and friends put up with her behaviour.
 Mum (voiced by Frances Barber) - Treasure's mother, who finds herself having to put up with having to look after both her troublesome daughter and her grumpy elderly mother. As much as she just wants Treasure to behave, she is shown in flashbacks to have been not that different from her daughter when she was her age.
 Grandma (voiced by Rosemary Leach) - Treasure's tough-as-nails grandmother, who despite her age is fiercely independent and tends to refuse from those who offer it, mainly from Brian. Her friends often come over to play bridge.
 Brian (voiced by Jonathan Kydd) - Mum's boyfriend, who sometimes comes over to visit. Treasure doesn't particularly approve of him, and he is similarly often taken aback by the behaviour of the family as a whole.
 Rosie (voiced by Tisha Martin) - One of Treasure's two best friends, an African-British girl who is more willing to go along with Treasure's antics than Delilah.
 Delilah (voiced by Elly Fairman) -  The other of Treasure's two best friends, a girl whose hair is dyed pink. She acts mostly as the voice of reason among the three, and when she goes along with Treasure's antics mostly does so begrudgingly.
 Mrs. Perez (voiced by Julie Legrand) - Treasure's family's next-door Spaniard neighbour, a somewhat uppity woman who doesn't mind her neighbours, but disapproves strongly of Treasure's behaviour. She has a son Treasure's age.
 Poppy (voiced by Kate O'Sullivan) - Treasure's pet dog, who has a habit of constantly drooling on things.

Telecast and home media
Treasure was aired on BBC Two in the United Kingdom, ABC Kids in Australia, and YTV in Canada. The series never saw a home release of any kind, and in online, thus most of it is considered lost media.

Episodes
Of the 13 episodes that originally aired, only five are currently known to survive online.

References

External links

2000s British animated television series
2000 British television series debuts
2001 British television series endings
2000s Canadian animated television series
2000 Canadian television series debuts
2001 Canadian television series endings
Australian Broadcasting Corporation original programming
YTV (Canadian TV channel) original programming
British children's animated television shows
Canadian children's animated television series
Television series by Cookie Jar Entertainment
Television series by DHX Media
Television shows set in London 
Lost television shows